Shurab-e Najm-e Soheyli (also Romanized as Shūrāb Najm-e Soheylī) is a village in Shurab Rural District, Veysian District, Dowreh County, Lorestan Province, Iran. At the 2006 census, its population was 415, in 99 families.

References 

Towns and villages in Dowreh County